

Skyline University College (SUC) is a university in University City of Sharjah, United Arab Emirates, on the border of Sharjah and Dubai.

SUC is approved, and its programs are accredited by the Commission on Academic Accreditation (CAA) of the Ministry of Higher Education and Scientific Research (MOHESR), United Arab Emirates. The college is a member of the Association to Advance Collegiate Schools of Business, and of the Accreditation Council for Business Schools and Programs.

SUC was established in September 1990 in Sharjah under the patronage of its ruler Sheikh Sultan bin Muhammad Al-Qasimi, a member of the UAE Supreme Council. It conducts a four-year Bachelor of Business Administration program, with majors in Travel & Tourism Management, Information Systems, International Business, Finance and Marketing. SUC also conducts a two-year Master of Business Administration program with an emphasis on Marketing, Finance, Human Resource Management & Strategic Management & Leadership; and short courses on IATA, CTH, GCAA & ACCA. Programs from autumn 2006 onwards are approved and accredited by the Ministry of Higher Education and Scientific Research, UAE.

See also
 University City of Sharjah
 List of universities in the United Arab Emirates

References

External links
 Skyline University College Sharjah website
 Universities and Colleges in Sharjah — TEN Yellow Pages

1990 establishments in the United Arab Emirates
Educational institutions established in 1990
Universities and colleges in Sharjah (city)
Sharjah (city)